= Lamb Meat Adjustment Assistance Program =

American government program

The Lamb Meat Adjustment Assistance Program was a four-year United States Department of Agriculture (USDA)-administered program initiated in 1999–2000 to help producers deal with import competition and help stabilize the lamb market. Through 2002, the program provided some $50 million in incentive payments to help producers increase the supply of domestic lamb meat.
